The 1998 Minnesota House of Representatives election was held in the U.S. state of Minnesota on November 3, 1998, to elect members to the House of Representatives of the 81st Minnesota Legislature. A primary election was held on September 15, 1998.

The Republican Party of Minnesota won a majority of seats, defeating the Minnesota Democratic–Farmer–Labor Party (DFL), which had a majority since the 1986 election. The new Legislature convened on January 6, 1999.

Results

See also
 Minnesota Senate election, 1996
 Minnesota gubernatorial election, 1998

References

1998 Minnesota elections
Minnesota House of Representatives elections
Minnesota